The Capitol is a 1,800-capacity live music venue in Hanover, Germany. It has hosted artists such as Red Hot Chili Peppers, Rory Gallagher, Iggy Pop and Robin Trower.
It is located in a building erected in 1930 built in Brick Expressionism style and uses rooms of a former cinema.

References

External links
 Official website

Music venues in Germany
Buildings and structures in Hanover